Ján Švehlík  (born 17 January 1950) is a former Slovak football player and later a football manager. He played for Czechoslovakia, for which he played 17 matches and scored 4 goals.

He played mostly for ŠK Slovan Bratislava.

International career
Švehlík made 17 appearances for the full Czechoslovakia national football team. He was a participant at the 1976 UEFA European Championship, which Czechoslovakia won. He scored an important first goal in the final against West Germany.

References

1950 births
Association football forwards
Czechoslovak footballers
Slovak footballers
Slovak football managers
ŠK Slovan Bratislava managers
Living people
UEFA Euro 1976 players
UEFA European Championship-winning players
Czechoslovakia international footballers
Dukla Prague footballers
ŠK Slovan Bratislava players
Czechoslovak expatriate footballers
Expatriate footballers in Belgium
Czechoslovak expatriate sportspeople in Belgium
People from Žiar nad Hronom District
Sportspeople from the Banská Bystrica Region